Jeff Coston (born October 15, 1955) is an American professional golfer.

Biography
Coston cites watching Jack Nicklaus tee off in the 1965 Greater Seattle Open Invitational at Inglewood Country Club as the moment he realized he wanted to dedicate his life to golf. He joined the PGA Tour in 1985. That year at the Buick Invitational Championship, a 14-year-old Phil Mickelson carried the scoreboard for the playing threesome of Coston, Steve Pate and Chris Perry. Coston played on the PGA Tour in 1985 and 1988. His best finish was a tied for seventh at the 1988 Anheuser-Busch Golf Classic. From 1991 to 1994, he played on the Ben Hogan/Nike Tour (now Nationwide Tour), winning once, at the 1991 Ben Hogan Shreveport Open.

Coston runs the Jeff Coston Academy, located at the Semiahmoo Resort near Blaine, Washington, opened in 1994. In 2000 he qualified for the U.S. Open, finishing 53rd. He is the second most prolific winner of the Pacific Northwest Senior PGA Championship since 1970, and the only player to have won it five times consecutively, having won the championship every year between 2006 and 2010. He has also won the Washington Senior Open every year between 2006 and 2010. He has been Pacific Northwest Player of the Year in 1995, 1996, 1997, 1999, 2000, 2001, 2002, 2003, 2004, 2006, 2007 and 2010 and PGA Senior Player of the Year consecutively in 2006, 2007, 2008, 2009, 2010.

Coston qualified for the 2015 Champions Tour by finishing third at qualifying school in 2014.

Amateur wins
this list may be incomplete
1977 Pacific Northwest Amateur

Professional wins (43)

Ben Hogan Tour wins (1)

Ben Hogan Tour playoff record (1–1)

Other wins (23)
1989 North Dakota Open
1995 Oregon Open
1996 Washington Open
1997 Rosaurs Spokane Open, Pacific Northwest PGA Championship
1999 Washington Open, Pacific Northwest PGA Championship
2000 Pacific Northwest PGA Championship
2001 Washington Open, Northwest Open
2002 Pacific Northwest PGA Championship
2003 Pacific Northwest PGA Championship
2004 Oregon Open
2006 Rosaurs Spokane Open, Guisti Memorial
2007 Northwest Open
2008 Rosaurs Spokane Open
2009 Pacific Northwest PGA Championship
2010 Washington Open, Pacific Northwest PGA Championship
2016 Washington Open
2021 Washington Open
2022 Pacific Northwest PGA Championship

Senior wins (25)
2006 Washington Senior Open, Pacific Northwest Senior PGA Championship
2007 Oregon Senior Open, Washington Senior Open, Pacific Northwest Senior PGA Championship
2008 Washington Senior Open, Pacific Northwest Senior PGA Championship
2009 Oregon Senior Open, Washington Senior Open, Pacific Northwest Senior PGA Championship
2010 Washington Senior Open, Pacific Northwest Senior PGA Championship
2011 Pacific Northwest Senior PGA Championship, Oregon Senior Open
2012 Oregon Senior Open
2013 Pacific Northwest Senior PGA Championship
2017 Oregon Senior Open
2018 Oregon Senior Open
2019 Oregon Senior Open
2020 Oregon Senior Open, Pacific Northwest Senior PGA Championship
2021 Washington Senior Open, Oregon Senior Open
2022 PNW Senior Players Championship, Washington Senior Open

See also
1984 PGA Tour Qualifying School graduates
1987 PGA Tour Qualifying School graduates

References

External links

American male golfers
PGA Tour golfers
PGA Tour Champions golfers
American golf instructors
Golfers from Seattle
People from Blaine, Washington
1955 births
Living people